Bristol Township may refer to the following places:

United States 
 Bristol Township, Kendall County, Illinois
 Bristol Township, Greene County, Iowa
 Bristol Township, Worth County, Iowa
 Bristol Township, Fillmore County, Minnesota
 Bristol Township, Morgan County, Ohio
 Bristol Township, Trumbull County, Ohio
 Bristol Township, Bucks County, Pennsylvania
 Bristol Township, Philadelphia County, Pennsylvania

Township name disambiguation pages